The Igede are an ethnic group in Nigeria.

Igede may also refer to:

 The Igede language
 Igede-Ekiti in Ekiti State of Nigeria
 a similar word in the Igbo language